Martin Company may refer to:
Martin Burn, a company in India founded as Martin Company in 1890
Glenn L. Martin Company, an American aircraft and aerospace manufacturing company founded in 1912 and closed in 1961

See also
Martin (disambiguation)